713 Luscinia is a large, main belt asteroid orbiting the Sun. It is a member of the Cybele asteroid group.

References

External links 
 Lightcurve plot of (713) Luscinia, Antelope Hills Observatory
 
 

000713
Discoveries by Joseph Helffrich
Named minor planets
000713
000713
19110418